Kevin Michael Hannon (born 4 May 1980) is an English former footballer who played in the Football League for Wrexham.

Career
Hannon was born in Whiston, Merseyside and began his career with Welsh side Wrexham. He made his debut to the "Dragons" as a substitute in a 3–2 defeat at home to Stoke City on 25 September 1999. He sustained a serious leg break in a friendly against an Icelandic team and after a number of failed attempts at rehabilitation he had to retire from football.

References
General
 . Retrieved 18 January 2013.
Specific

1980 births
Living people
Sportspeople from Knowsley, Merseyside
English footballers
Association football defenders
Wrexham A.F.C. players
English Football League players
People from Whiston, Merseyside